Venturia is a genus of parasitoid wasps belonging to the family Ichneumonidae.

The genus has cosmopolitan distribution.

Among the species in the genus are:
 Venturia ahlensis Maheshwary, 1977 
 Venturia altia (Morley, 1913) 
 Venturia canescens (Gravenhorst, 1829)

References

Ichneumonidae
Ichneumonidae genera